The fifth season of the American television romantic comedy-drama Sex and the City aired in the United States on HBO. The show was created by Darren Star while Star, Michael Patrick King, John P. Melfi, series lead actress Sarah Jessica Parker, Cindy Chupack, and Jenny Bicks served as executive producers. The series was produced by Darren Star Productions, HBO Original Programming, and Warner Bros. Television. Parker portrays the lead character Carrie Bradshaw, while Kim Cattrall, Kristin Davis and Cynthia Nixon played her best friends Samantha Jones, Charlotte York, and Miranda Hobbes.

In season five, Carrie, in the midst of a dating hiatus, lands a publishing deal for her column and begins a relationship with a fellow writer. Miranda becomes a mother with Steve and struggles to manage a job, dating life and her friendships with the other girls. Samantha dates Richard again, but battles with trust issues stemming from his infidelity. A recently divorced Charlotte gets into a legal battle with Trey's mother over their apartment and during the legal proceedings, falls in love with her lawyer.

In the United Kingdom, the season was broadcast on Wednesday nights between January 1 and February 19, 2003. The season received mixed to positive critical responses while receiving several awards and nominations, including winning the Golden Globe Award for Best Supporting Actress – Series, Miniseries or Television Film for Cattrall. The season averaged over 7 million viewers.

Production
The fifth season of Sex and the City was produced by Darren Star Productions and Warner Bros. Television, in association with HBO Original Programming. The series is based on the book of the same name, written by Candice Bushnell, which contains stories from her column with the New York Observer. The show featured production from Antonia Ellis, Jane Raab and series star Sarah Jessica Parker, also an executive producer alongside Michael Patrick King, John Melfi, Cindy Chupack, and Jenny Bicks. Episodic writers returning for the fifth season included Bicks, Chupack, King, Julie Rottenberg, and Elisa Zuritsky. New writers enlisted for the season included Alexa Junge and Judy Toll. The season was directed by returning directors King, Charles McDougall, John David Coles, and Michael Engler.

Cast and characters

Like the previous seasons, season five features the same principal cast and characters. Sarah Jessica Parker portrays Carrie Bradshaw, a fashionable middle aged woman who writes about sex and life in New York City in her column, "Sex and the City", with the fictional New York Star. Kim Cattrall played the promiscuous public relations agent Samantha Jones. Kristin Davis portrayed Charlotte York MacDougal, an optimistic, straight laced former art curator navigating being newly single while moving on from her failed marriage. Cynthia Nixon acted as the acerbic and sarcastic lawyer Miranda Hobbes, who faces struggles as a working mother.

The fifth season featured a number of recurring and guest actors whose characters contributed significantly to the series plotlines. Chris Noth reprised his role as Mr. Big for one episode this season. David Eigenberg portrayed Miranda's on-off boyfriend, bar owner and father of her child Steve Brady. Willie Garson played entertainment manager and Carrie's gay friend Stanford Blatch. Mario Cantone returns to the series as a recurring guest actor, portraying Charlotte's gay friend and former wedding planner Anthony Marantino. Frances Sternhagen reprised her role as Trey's overbearing and intrusive mother Bunny MacDougal. James Remar reprised his role as hotelier and Samantha's boyfriend Richard Wright. Lynn Cohen reprises her role as Magda, Miranda's foreign housekeeper. Comedienne Molly Shannon recurs as Lily Martin while Ron Livingston appears as Jack Berger, a professional writer.

Reception

Viewership and ratings
Season five of Sex and the City debuted on July 21, 2002 at 9:00 p.m. Eastern Time Zone with the episode "Anchors Away". The episode was viewed by 7.93 million people, becoming the most watched episode of the series at the time. It earned a 4.8 Nielsen household rating, indicative of 5.07 million households in which the episode was viewed. Viewership for the season fluctuated up and down between 5.95 million and 7.93 million viewers, but ranked number one among pay cable program every week. The season finale, "I Love a Charade", premiered on September 8, 2002 to an audience of 7.33 million viewers. Earning a 4.7 household rating, the episode was viewed by 5.04 million households. The fifth season averaged over 7 million viewers per 8 episodes. In the United Kingdom, the season aired on Channel 4, garnering high ratings and landing among the top 30 programs of the week.

Critical reviews
Mike Long of DVD Talk gave the season 4.5 out of 5 stars, highlight the season's plotlines and dialogue despite its shortened length. Bryan Buyn of DVD Verdict found the series at this point to be pandering to the public, criticizing the continued focus on the four girls "chasing "cute boys" and blathering endlessly over breakfast about sex, relationships, and sex." Buyn, however, stated that the criticism "stems from the fact that the show is just good enough to make me wish it were better", and offered praise to the leading actresses' performance. Dan Jewel, writing for Media Life Magazine, praised the series for portraying Miranda's motherhood honestly and for giving the characters more depth, noting that the show walks a "fine line" between poignancy and mawkishness.

Awards and nominations

At the 60th Golden Globe Awards, Kim Cattrall won the award for Best Supporting Actress – Series, Miniseries or Television Film. Co-star Cynthia Nixon also received a nomination for Best Supporting Actress – Series, Miniseries or Television Film while Sarah Jessica Parker received a nomination for a Best Actress – Television Series Musical or Comedy. The series was nominated for the award for Best Television Series – Musical or Comedy for the fifth consecutive year, but lost out to Curb Your Enthusiasm.

At the 55th Primetime Emmy Awards, Sex and the City received twelve nominations and won the award for Outstanding Casting for a Comedy Series. Sarah Jessica Parker was nominated for the award for Outstanding Lead Actress in a Comedy Series for the fifth time. Kim Cattrall and Cynthia Nixon were both nominated for an Outstanding Supporting Actress in a Comedy Series Emmy for their respective portrayals of Samantha Jones and Miranda Hobbes, being Cattrall's fourth nomination and Nixon's second. "Plus One is the Loneliest Number" received two nominations: Outstanding Hairstyling for a Series and Outstanding Makeup for a Series (Non-Prosthetic). The episode "I Love a Charade" was nominated for awards for Outstanding Costumes for a Series, Outstanding Directing for a Comedy Series and Outstanding Writing for a Comedy Series.

Chris Noth and Nixon received nominations for Best Supporting Actor and Actress – Television Series at the 7th Golden Satellite Awards. At the 2003 American Cinema Editors Awards, Wendey Stanzler won the award for Best Edited Half-Hour Series for Television. Patricia Field was nominated for award for Best Costume Design – Contemporary TV Series at the 2003 Costume Designers Guild Awards. At the 55th Directors Guild of America Awards, Michael Patrick King was nominated for the award for Outstanding Directing – Comedy Series for "Plus is the Loneliest Number". At the 2002 Writers Guild of America Awards, three episodes from the fifth season were nominated for Best Episodic Comedy. Series producers Cindy Chupack, King, John P. Melfi, and Parker were nominated for the award for Producers Guild of America Award for Best Episodic Comedy. At the 9th Screen Actors Guild Awards, Cattrall was nominated for Outstanding Performance by a Female Actor in a Comedy Series while the cast was nominated for Outstanding Performance by an Ensemble in a Comedy Series.

Episodes

Ratings

United States

United Kingdom
All viewing figures and ranks are sourced from BARB.

Home release

References

2002 American television seasons
Sex and the City